Kings of Punk is the third release and first LP by hardcore punk band Poison Idea, released in 1986 through Pushead's Pusmort Records label. It was re-released by Reflex/Wolfpack Records in 2003 on a limited vinyl pressing.

Track listing
All songs written by Jerry A, except where noted.
"Lifestyles" (Jerry A, Pig Champion) – 3:14
"Short Fuse" – 1:59
"God Not God" (Jerry A, Chris Tense) – 0:51
"Ugly American" – 2:58
"Subtract" (Chris Tense) – 1:40
"Cop an Attitude" (Jerry A, Pig Champion) – 2:25
"Death Wish Kids" – 2:15
"Made to Be Broken" – 2:53
"Tormented Imp" (Jerry A, Chris Tense) – 2:13
"One by One" (Jerry A, Chris Tense) – 2:17
"Out of the Picture" (Jerry A, Chris Tense) – 2:16

Personnel
Jerry A. – Vocals
Tom "Pig Champion" Roberts – Guitar
Chris Tense – Bass
Dean Johnson – Drums

References

Poison Idea albums
1986 albums